Ziza may refer to:

 Ziza (moth), a genus of moths in the family Erebidae
 Ziza (biblical figure), a minor biblical figure